Jamal Muhammad Abidat is a Jordanian politician who served as Member of Parliament (MP) of Jordan.

References

Year of birth missing (living people)
Living people
Members of the Parliament of Jordan